Llandovery is a market town and community in Carmarthenshire, Wales.

History

Etymology
A smaller watercourse, the Bawddwr, runs through and under the town.

Roman legacy
The Roman fort at Llanfair Hill to the north-east of the modern town was known to the Romans as Alabum. It was built around AD 50–60 as part of a strategy for the conquest of Wales. A Roman road heads across Mynydd Bach Trecastell to the south-east of Llandovery bound for the fort of Brecon Gaer. Another heads down the Towy valley for Carmarthen, whilst a third makes for the goldmines at Dolaucothi.

Norman and medieval castle

Attractions in the town include the remains of the Norman Llandovery Castle, built in 1110. It was almost immediately captured by the Welsh and changed hands between them and the Normans until the reign of King Edward I of England in the late 13th century. The castle was used by King Henry IV while on a sortie into Wales, when he executed Llywelyn ap Gruffydd Fychan in the market place. It was later attacked by the forces of Owain Glyndŵr in 1403.

Welsh hero
A  stainless-steel statue to Llywelyn ap Gruffydd Fychan was unveiled by Mayor Vivienne Price in 2001 on the north side of Llandovery Castle, overlooking the place of his execution 600 years earlier. He had led the army of King Henry IV on a "wild goose chase", under the pretence of leading them to a secret rebel camp and an ambush of Glyndŵr's forces. King Henry lost patience with him, exposed the charade and had him half hanged, disembowelled in front of his own eyes, beheaded and quartered – the quarters salted and dispatched to other Welsh towns for public display.

The design of the statue, by Toby and Gideon Petersen, was chosen after a national competition. It was funded by the National Lottery and the Arts Council of Wales.

Other history
According to folklore, the Physicians of Myddfai practised in the area in the 13th century.

The Bank of the Black Ox, one of the first Welsh banks, was established by a wealthy cattle drover. The original bank building was part of the King's Head Inn. It later became part of Lloyds Bank.

The population in 1841 was 1,709.

Buildings

The town has a theatre (Llandovery Theatre), a heritage centre, a private school (Llandovery College) and a tourist information and heritage centre, which houses exhibitions on the Tonn Press, the area's droving history, and the 19th-century geologist Sir Roderick Impey Murchison, whose work here resulted in the name "Llandovery" being given to rocks of a certain age across the world. The Llandovery epoch is the earliest in the Silurian period of geological time.

In the small central market place stands Llandovery Town Hall (1857–1858) by the architect Richard Kyke Penson. This was designed in the Italianate style with a courtroom over an open market. Behind are police cells with iron grilles; entry to the old courtroom (now a library) is via a door on the ground floor of the tower.

The 12th-century Grade I listed St Mary's Church in the north of the town is among the largest medieval churches in Carmarthenshire.

The Memorial Chapel in Stryd y Bont was built as a memorial to the hymnist William Williams Pantycelyn.

Education
The town's comprehensive school, Ysgol Pantycelyn, with about 300 pupils, was closed on 31 August 2013 and merged with Ysgol Tre-Gib in Ffairfach to form Ysgol Bro Dinefwr.

The town has an independent day and boarding school, Llandovery College.

Sport
Llandovery has a leading Welsh Premiership rugby union team, Llandovery RFC, nicknamed The Drovers, active as such since at least 1877 and a founder member of the Welsh Rugby Union. It has successful junior and youth sections. A number of former players have gone on to represent Wales (and some other nations) in international rugby. Home games are played at its ground in Church Bank.

Llandovery Junior Football Club has a membership of over 70 from Llandovery and its surrounding area. It provides coaching and competitive scope for all aged 6 to 16 years. The club currently has an Under 14 team in the Carmarthenshire Junior League, and Under 11 and Under 8 teams playing in the Carmarthen Mini Football League.

A Llandovery Golf Club, founded in 1910, survived until the onset of the Second World War. Golfing now takes place on the Llandovery College 9-hole course.

Governance
An electoral ward of the same name exists. This covers Llandovery and stretches to the north. The total ward population taken at the 2011 Census was 2,689. The community is bordered by those of Llanfair-ar-y-bryn, Myddfai, Llanwrda, and Cilycwm, all being in Carmarthenshire. , the mayor of Llandovery is Councillor Louise Wride.

Llandovery is twinned with Pluguffan in Brittany, France.

Transport
Llandovery stands at the junction of the main A40 and A483 roads.

Notable residents
In date-of-birth order. See also :Category:People from Llandovery
Twm Siôn Cati (16th c.), figure in Welsh folklore, sometimes as an outlaw and a thief
Rhys Prichard (1579–1644), Welsh-language poet (Cannwyll y Cymry – The Welshman's Candle) and Anglican Vicar of Llandovery
William Williams Pantycelyn (1717–1791), highly regarded hymnist and prose writer associated with the Welsh Methodist revival
Josiah Rees (1744–1804), Welsh Unitarian minister, schoolmaster and writer
David Jones (1765–1816), Welsh barrister known as "the Welsh Freeholder"; came from Bwlchygwynt
William Hallowes Miller FRS (1801–1880), Welsh mineralogist, helped found modern crystallography; born at Velindre
Rice Rees (1804–1839), Anglican priest, fellow of Jesus College, Oxford, lecturer at St David's College, Lampeter and Chaplain to the Bishop of St Davids
William Saunders (1806–1851), Welsh-language poet, writer and printer
David Jones (1810–1869), banker and Carmarthenshire Conservative MP
John Jones (1812–1886), banker and Carmarthenshire Conservative MP
Major Sir David Hughes-Morgan (1871–1941), solicitor and landowner

Sport 
Aneurin Rees (1858–1932), solicitor, Town Clerk of Merthyr Tydfil, rugby union player for Wales and golfer
Edward John Lewis (1859–1925), physician and rugby union player for Wales
Conway Rees (1870–1932), rugby union player for Wales, and schoolmaster in England and India
Carwyn Davies (1964–1997), farmer and rugby union player for Wales
Emyr Phillips (born 1987), rugby union player for Wales
Wyn Jones (born 1992), rugby union player for Wales

Nearby places
The road follows an original Roman road to Llanio fort.

Llandovery lies just north of Brecon Beacons National Park and Fforest Fawr Geopark, whose geological heritage is celebrated. These designated landscapes are centred on Bannau Sir Gâr or the Carmarthen Fans, themselves part of the Black Mountain extending north towards the town, as Mynydd Myddfai and Mynydd Bach Trecastell. The village of Myddfai lies within the National Park, 4 miles (6 km) to the south-east of Llandovery.

The route to the dam also passes Twm Siôn Cati's Cave at the RSPB's Dinas reserve.

References

External links

 
Towns in Carmarthenshire
Communities in Carmarthenshire
Market towns in Wales